Michael Nunn  (born 1967) is a British ballet dancer, choreographer, and a television and film director/producer.

Early life
Michael Nunn was born in London in 1967, the son of a builder.

Career

Dancer
Nunn joined the Royal Ballet in 1987, and was promoted to first soloist in 1997. His first big break was when Kenneth MacMillan chose him to dance the male lead, Crown Prince Rudolf, in Mayerling, a role originally created on David Wall.

In 2001, together with principal dancer William Trevitt, he left to found the modern dance groups, BalletBoyz and George Piper Dances.

Choreographer
Nunn now works as a choreographer with BalletBoyz and George Piper Dances.

Producer
A 90-minute abridgment of Kenneth Macmillan's ballet Romeo and Juliet was produced by Michael Nunn and William Trevitt for BBC television and broadcast in 2020 on PBS.

Director

Personal life
He is married, and lives in Kew Gardens, London.

Nunn is an ambassador for Borne, a medical research charity looking into the causes of premature birth. In March 2019, Nunn hosted Borne to Dance with Darcey Bussell at the Royal Opera House to raise money for premature birth research.

References

1967 births
Dancers from London
British choreographers
British male ballet dancers
Living people
Dancers of The Royal Ballet
Officers of the Order of the British Empire